Adolph Tambellini (February 4, 1936 – February 23, 2004) was a Canadian ice hockey player.

Career
Born in Trail, British Columbia, Tambellini played junior hockey with the Lethbridge Native Sons before playing professionally for the Calgary Stampeders, Trail Smoke Eaters and Seattle Totems as well as a spell in Austria for EC KAC.

Internationally, Tambellini was a member of the gold-medal-winning Smoke Eaters team that won the 1961 World Ice Hockey Championships – the last amateur team from Canada to do so.

Family
His son, Steve Tambellini, played in the National Hockey League (NHL) and later became an executive for the Vancouver Canucks and general manager for the Edmonton Oilers. His grandson, Jeff Tambellini, also became a player in the NHL and his youngest grandson Adam Tambellini was drafted in the 2013 NHL Entry Draft, 65th overall, by the New York Rangers.

References

External links

1936 births
2004 deaths
Calgary Stampeders (WHL) players
Canadian ice hockey forwards
EC KAC players
Ice hockey people from British Columbia
Sportspeople from Trail, British Columbia
Seattle Totems (WHL) players
Trail Smoke Eaters players